Women's Soccer has been played at the Saint Louis University since 1996.  The Billikens play at Hermann Stadium in Midtown St. Louis, Missouri.  Katie Shields is the current coach.  They have made four appearances in the NCAA tournament.

Seasons

Current roster
2020-21 Roster

References 

 
B
1996 establishments in Missouri
Association football clubs established in 1996